Manuel Guijarro may refer to:
 Manuel Guijarro Doménech, Spanish racing cyclist
 Manuel Guijarro (athlete), Spanish sprinter